Ercolano is a town in Italy, near Naples. Ercolano may also refer to:
Barbara Ercolano, Italian astrophysicist
Ercolano Ercolanetti (1615–1687), Italian painter
SS Ercolano, a steamship sunk in 1854
Vincenzo Ercolano (1517–1586), Catholic bishop

See also
For saints named Ercolano, see Herculanus (disambiguation)